Boundedness or bounded may refer to:

Economics

 Bounded rationality, the idea that human rationality in decision-making is bounded by the available information, the cognitive limitations, and the time available to make the decision
 Bounded emotionality, a concept within communication theory that stems from emotional labor and bounded rationality

Linguistics

 Boundedness (linguistics), whether a situation has a clearly defined beginning or end

Mathematics

 Boundedness axiom, the axiom schema of replacement

 Bounded deformation, a function whose distributional derivatives are not quite well-behaved-enough to qualify as functions of bounded variation, although the symmetric part of the derivative matrix does meet that condition
 Bounded growth, occurs when the growth rate of a mathematical function is constantly increasing at a decreasing rate
 Bounded operator, a linear transformation L between normed vector spaces for which the ratio of the norm of L(v) to that of v is bounded by the same number over all non-zero vectors v
 Unbounded operator, a linear operator defined on a subspace
 Bounded poset, a partially ordered set that has both a greatest and a least element
 Bounded set, a set that is finite in some sense
 Bounded function, a function or sequence whose possible values form a bounded set
Bounded set (topological vector space), a set in which every neighborhood of the zero vector can be inflated to include the set
Bounded variation, a real-valued function whose total variation is bounded
Bounded pointer, a pointer that is augmented with additional information that enable the storage bounds within which it may point to be deduced

See also
 Boundless (disambiguation)
 Unbound (disambiguation)